Dyakonov ( (masculine),  (feminine)), Diakonoff, Diakonov, or Diakonof  is a Russian surname meaning "a deacon's". Notable people with the surname include:
Anatoly Dyakonov (1907–1972), Soviet general
Alexey Diakonoff (1907–1989), Dutch-Russian entomologist
 (1949–2012), Russian physicist
Elena Diakonova, known as Gala Dalí, (1894–1982), Russian model and wife of artist Dalí
Igor Diakonoff (1915–1999), linguist, translator, and historian of the Ancient Near East
Kathryn Dyakanoff Seller (1884–1980), Alaska Native educator
Nina Dyakonova (1915–2013), Russian researcher
Yevgeny Dyakonov (1935–2006), Russian mathematician
Vasily Dyakonov (1946–2012), governor of Krasnodar Krai
Mikhail Dyakonov (b. 1940), Russian physicist, discoverer of Dyakonov surface waves
Pavel Dyakonov (b. 1973), football player
Tatyana Dyakonova (b. 1970), Russian politician 

Russian-language surnames